This is a list of seasons played by Associação Portuguesa de Desportos in Brazilian (state and national leagues) and South American football, from 1971 (year of Brasileirão's creation) to the most recent completed season.

Seasons

Brasileirão era

References

External links

Seasons
Portuguesa